Line 1 of the Chengdu Metro is the first line to enter revenue service on the metro network in Chengdu, Sichuan, China.  The line started construction in 2005, and entered service on September 27, 2010. On July 25, 2015, an extension towards Guangdu was opened for service.

Line 1 is a crosstown north-south trunk route, stretching from Weijianian in the north of town to Science City in southern Chengdu.  This line serves both the northern and the southern railway stations.

Between Chengdu South Railway Station and Western China International Expo City Station, the line runs adjacent to Line 18 essentially forming a four track subway. Line 1 operates as the local service between the two stations while Line 18 serves as the express, skipping a number of stops that Line 1 makes. The four track alignment with Line 18 will be extended to North Railway Station once Phase 3 of Line 18's construction is completed.

Opening timeline

Stations

Future extension 
It was proposed in Phase 3 that line 1 should be extended to Laijiadian, or even Dafeng. However this plan is stalled due to military zone in the affected area.

See also
Urbanrail.net page on Chengdu Metro
Photo of Jinjiang Hotel station
Photo of Tianfu Square station

References

Chengdu Metro lines
Railway lines opened in 2010
2010 establishments in China